The Anglo-American School of Moscow ( "Anglo-amerikanskaya Shkola v Moskvye") in Moscow, Russia, is an independent, non-profit, co-educational, international day school catering for students between the ages of 4 and 18 (Pre-kindergarten to Grade 12), chartered by the American, British and Canadian embassies. It is located a few miles northwest of downtown Moscow in the Pokrovskoye-Streshnevo District. AAS Moscow delivers an international standards-based curriculum aligned to current recommendations of US professional associations. Grade 11 and 12 students can opt into the DP IB International Baccalaureate program and the Primary Years Program (PYP) is the focus for younger children. 

AAS Moscow was founded in 1949 to serve the educational needs of diplomatic children who could not attend Soviet schools at the time. 

AAS Moscow currently has approximately 900 students from 60 nationalities. The majority of students are the children of diplomats and foreign businesspeople. 

The school is fully accredited by the New England Association of Schools and Colleges, the Council of International Schools, and the International Baccalaureate Organization. It is also a member of the National Association of Independent Schools, the European Council of International Schools, and the Central and Eastern European Schools Association.

Overview
The school operates under the aegis of a director and a board of trustees. The director is Rhonda Norris, who arrived in 2018. It is organized into three divisions, elementary school (pre-K to grade 5), the middle school (grades 6–8) and high school (grades 9–12). Each division has a principal (Jeff Hinton for the elementary school and Dr. Chris Schuster for the middle school and high school).

The high school offers the International Baccalaureate Diploma Programme, and a college-preparatory program leading to a high school diploma. The elementary school offers the International Baccalaureate Primary Years Programme. The school performs well, some graduates being accepted by Ivy League schools, and has been maintaining an IB score that is above the world average.

First priority on admission is given to the children of American, British and Canadian diplomats, second priority is for the children of those countries (America, Britain, and Canada) and third is given to children whose parents work for a company or organization that has reserved seats. Any remaining places are available to any child who meets the general admission requirements while limiting to 15% the number of students from any one country except the United States, United Kingdom and Canada. The school is currently heavily oversubscribed but welcomes admissions inquiries.

Student body and life
As of the 2018–19 school year, AAS had 1200 students originating from more than 60 different countries. AAS is permitted to grant enrollment to Russian nationals, even those without foreign passports. The class sizes typically range from 16-18 students per class, and with 150 teachers that means an 8:1 student-teacher ratio. All teachers are principally from the United Kingdom, United States, or Canada.

Fees
The school is a not-for-profit organization financed by school fees, though it does receive an annual U.S. State Department grant which is used to enhance learning support programs and campus security. Support from the chartering embassies is of a non-financial nature. Fees differ by age group, ranging from $18,400–$31,600 USD.

Facilities
In the year 2000, AAS Moscow moved into a purpose-built campus nestled between the Pokrovskoye-Streshnevo Forest Park and the Moscow River canal, and adjacent to the Pokrovsky Hills community.

Saint Petersburg campus
The school also had a campus in Saint Petersburg which closed in September 2018.

See also
Pokrovsky Hills

Russian embassy schools in the United States and the United Kingdom:
 Russian Embassy School in London
 Russian Mission School in New York
 Russian Embassy School in Washington, D.C.

References

External links
 Anglo-American School of Moscow

British international schools in Russia
American international schools in Russia
Canadian international schools in Russia
Soviet Union–United Kingdom relations
Soviet Union–United States relations
Canada–Russia relations
Russia–United Kingdom relations
Russia–United States relations
International schools in Moscow
Educational institutions established in 1949
1949 establishments in the Soviet Union
Schools in the Soviet Union